The 2018 Maidstone Borough Council elections took place on 3 May 2018 to elect members of Maidstone Borough Council in Kent, England. The council remained in no overall control, with the Conservatives overtaking the Liberal Democrats as the largest party on the council.

Election result

Ward results

Allington

Bearsted

Boxley

Bridge

Coxheath and Hunton

East

Fant

Harrietsham and Lenham

Headcorn

Heath

High Street

Marden and Yalding

North

Park Wood

Shepway North

Shepway South

South

Staplehurst

References

Maidstone
Maidstone Borough Council elections